Hana Pleskačová (born May 20, 1966) is a Czechoslovak sprint canoer who competed in the late 1980s. At the 1988 Summer Olympics in Seoul, she was eliminated in the semifinals of the K-1 500 m event.

References
Sports-Reference.com profile

1966 births
Canoeists at the 1988 Summer Olympics
Czechoslovak female canoeists
Living people
Olympic canoeists of Czechoslovakia